Union High School is a public high school in Roosevelt, Utah, United States. As of 2014, the school had a student population of 887. The school serves both Duchesne County and Uintah County, which is the source of the name. The school is a part of the Duchesne County School District.

In 2013 the school's football coach Matt Labrum chose to suspend the entire football program in response to cyberbullying and other behavioral problems with the players. Labrum was supported by the school, and no parents complained about the decision. Players in the program were required to complete community service and improve attendance and grades before being allowed to play again.

References

External links

Schools in Duchesne County, Utah
Public high schools in Utah